Xceed Financial Credit Union was a federally chartered credit union and financial institution that served Xerox, OfficeMax, Seneca Park Zoo, Heal the Bay, Webster Public Library, Alorica, and more than 300 additional select employer groups (SEGs), organizations, and communities nationwide. It operated Financial Centers and sales offices in five states.

As a federally chartered credit union, Xceed Financial Credit Union was governed by the National Credit Union Administration (NCUA), the federal agency responsible for regulating federal credit unions.

History
Xceed Financial Credit Union started in 1964 as Scientific Data Systems Credit Union and became Xerox Federal Credit Union in 1970. In April, 2008, the credit union changed its name to Xceed Financial Credit Union, and was typically referred to as Xceed or Xceed Financial. It had nearly $1 billion in assets under management and 70,000 members.

In April 2021 Xceed merged into Kinecta Federal Credit Union.

Products and services
Xceed Financial offered the following:
 Share accounts (checking, savings, money market, certificate, individual retirement accounts, health savings accounts)
 New and used consumer loans (auto, boat, recreational vehicle, motorcycle)
 Real estate (fixed- and adjustable-rate mortgages, home equity loan)
 Insurance services (personal and home)
 Electronic services (online banking, mobile banking, electronic bill payment, electronic statements)
 Investment, insurance, and financial planning services through LPL Financial
 Business banking (share accounts and loans)

Locations
California
 El Segundo
 Menlo Park
 San Jose
New Jersey
 Parsippany
New York
 Pittsford (town)
 Rochester
 Webster (town)

References

External links
Official web site

Credit unions based in California
Banks established in 1964